Luis Miguel Martín Berlanas (born 11 January 1972 in Madrid) is a former Spanish long-distance runner. He specializes in the 3000 metres steeplechase. He took up the event in 1998. He is a vegetarian since 1996.
Since September 2015 he is the head coach of Nike Run Club Madrid

Achievements

Personal bests
1500 metres - 3:36.11 min (2002)
3000 metres - 7:50.27 min (2000)
5000 metres - 13:54.35 min (2002)
3000 metres steeplechase - 8:07.44 min (2002)

References

External links

1972 births
Living people
Spanish male long-distance runners
Spanish male middle-distance runners
Spanish male steeplechase runners
Athletes (track and field) at the 2000 Summer Olympics
Athletes (track and field) at the 2004 Summer Olympics
Olympic athletes of Spain
Athletes from Madrid
European Athletics Championships medalists